Oreodontoides is an extinct genus of oreodont of the family Merycoidodontidae endemic to North America. Fossils have been uncovered throughout the western U.S. including at sites in Oregon, Wyoming, and South Dakota.

References

Oreodonts
Prehistoric mammals of North America
Oligocene even-toed ungulates
Miocene even-toed ungulates
Aquitanian genus extinctions
Chattian genus first appearances
Prehistoric even-toed ungulate genera